Harrison Ford is an American actor who has received numerous accolades throughout his career.

In his seven decades-long acting career, Ford has played multiple iconic cinematic characters, including Han Solo in the Star Wars saga, Indiana Jones in the titular film franchise, and Rick Deckard in two Blade Runner films. For the aforementioned portrayals, he has received several wins and nominations at the Saturn Awards, winning Best Actor for Raiders of the Lost Ark (1981) and Star Wars: The Force Awakens (2015).

He received critical acclaim for his performance as Sergeant John Book in the 1985 thriller Witness, for which he earned nominations for Best Actor at the Academy Awards, British Academy Film Awards (BAFTA), and Golden Globe Awards. He has then received three additional Golden Globe nominations for the films The Mosquito Coast (1986), The Fugitive (1993), and Sabrina (1995).

For his lifetime achievements, Ford has been recognized with the AFI Life Achievement Award, the Golden Globe Cecil B. DeMille Award, the Honorary César, and an honorary award for Worldwide Contribution to Entertainment from the British Academy of Film and Television Arts. He is also a licensed pilot and has received various accolades honoring achievements in the aerospace industry, including the Wright Brothers Memorial Trophy.

Awards and nominations

Other honors

Notes

References

External links
  

Ford, Harrison